Events from the year 1683 in the Kingdom of Scotland.

Incumbents

 Monarch – Charles II

Judiciary 
 Lord President of the Court of Session – Sir David Falconer
 Lord Justice General – James Drummond, 4th Earl of Perth
 Lord Justice Clerk – Sir Richard Maitland

Events 
 January – Rye House Plot to assassinate Charles II: English lawyer Aaron Smith is sent to Scotland to confer with Scottish co-conspirators. Those implicated include the exiled Archibald Campbell, 9th Earl of Argyll, Baillie of Jerviswood, John Cochrane of Ochiltree, George Melville, 1st Earl of Melville, and his son David Leslie, 3rd Earl of Leven, Sir Patrick Hume, 2nd Baronet, and Rev. Robert Ferguson. The plot is discovered on 12 June.
 23 November – Charles II grants a charter for the colony of New Jersey to 24 proprietors, 12 of whom are Scots. The Scottish settlement is to be in East Jersey and Scots begin arriving here at Perth Amboy. The driving force among the Scots is Robert Barclay of Urie, a prominent Quaker and first Governor of East Jersey.
 A public library is first recorded at Kirkwall on Orkney.
 Newbridge Inn first built near Edinburgh.
 Ongoing – The Killing Time.

Births
 2 February – Walter Stuart, 6th Lord Blantyre, politician and landowner (died 1713)

Deaths
 10 November – Robert Morison, botanist and taxonomist (born 1620)

See also

Timeline of Scottish history

References

 
Years of the 17th century in Scotland